Richard Isanove (born 1968) is a French artist and painter working in the American comic book industry.

Early life
Richard Isanove was born in the south of France, studied film and animation at the Ecole nationale superieure des arts decoratifs in Paris, and moved to the United States in 1994 to study animation at the California Institute of the Arts.

Career
While in school, he was hired by Brian Haberlin as a staff colorist for Top Cow where, one year later, he became Art Director.

He went on to free-lance for multiple comics companies before settling at Marvel Comics. His distinctive coloring on the Wolverine: Origin series marked a new direction in coloring in the comics medium. It was soon followed by Neil Gaiman's Marvel 1602 and in 2007 Stephen King's The Dark Tower: The Gunslinger Born. he now alternates color work and fully painted work for Marvel and DC Comics.

Awards
Isanove won the Wizard Fan Award in 2001 for his work on Wolverine: Origin and a Quill Award in 2005 for Marvel 1602.

Bibliography

Writer
Savage Wolverine: Wrath

Pencils/layout interior
X-Men Unlimited vol. 1 #48
The Dark Tower: The Gunslinger Born #4-7 Backstory illustrations
The Dark Tower: The Long Road Home Backstory illustrations
The Dark Tower: Treachery #1-4, 6 Backstory illustrations
American Eagle #1
The Dark Tower: The Fall of Gilead
The Dark Tower: Last Shots
Savage Wolverine: Wrath
Edge of Spider-Verse #1: Spider-Man Noir
DC Secret Origins: Constantine
Secret Wars Journal #3: Wolverine Noir

Pencils/layout covers
Army of Darkness: Ashes 2 Ashes
Army of Darkness: Shop till You Drop Dead
Red Sonja
Savage Tales of Red Sonja #1-2
The Dark Tower: Treachery #4 Alternative Cover
The Stand: Captain Trips #4 Alternative Cover
The Man with No Name #1-10
Terminator #1-3
Savage Wolverine: Wrath

Colors interior
The 100 Greatest Marvels of All Time #4
Ant-Man Big Christmas
Arcanum
Black Panther vol. 4 #15
Captain America: Red, White and Blue
Conan the Barbarian (Dark Horse) Red Nails #1
Conan the Barbarian (Dark Horse) Rogues in the House
Cyberforce #25-32
Cyblade/Ghost Rider #1
Daredevil vol. 2 #5-11, 13-17
Daredevil: Father #1-5
Fantastic Firsts #1
Ghost Rider/Ballistic #1
Heroes
Magneto Rex
Marvel 1602
New Avengers Annual #1
Savage Wolverine: Wrath
The Sentry vol. 2 #8
Silver Surfer/Weapon Zero #1
Spider-Man: One More Day
The Dark Tower: The Gunslinger Born
The Dark Tower: The Long Road Home
The Dark Tower: Treachery
The Dark Tower: The Fall of Gilead
The Dark Tower: Battle of Jericho Hill
The Dark Tower: The Journey Begins
The Dark Tower: The Little Sisters of Eluria
The Dark Tower: The Battle of Tull
The Dark Tower: The Way Station
The Dark Tower: The Man in Black
The Dark Tower: Last Shots
Ultimate Iron Man #1-5
Ultimate Six #1
Ultimate Spider-Man #92-93
Ultimate X-Men #1-2, 4-7, 12
Uncanny X-Men #381, 383-384, 386-388
Weapon Zero/Silver Surfer #1
Wolverine/Hulk #1-4
Wolverine: Origin
X-Men vol. 2 #82-84
X-Men/Star Trek #1
X-Men Unlimited vol. 1 #48

Colors covers
The Amazing Spider-Man #515, 517
Ant-Man Big Christmas #1
Art of Marvel vol. 2 HC
Astonishing X-Men vol. 3 #1
Before the Fantastic Four: The Storms #3
Best of the Fantastic Four vol. 1 HC
Bishop, the Last X-Man #1-2
Blink #1, 4
The Call of Duty: The Brotherhood #5-6
Captain America vol. 3 #32
Daredevil vol. 2 #6-8
Deathlok vol. 3 #1
Doctor Spectrum #1-3
Fantastic Four vol. 3 #60-70
Fantastic Four vol. 1 #501-502, 509-513, 523
Fantastic Four: House of M #1
Iron Man vol. 3 #26-27, 29, 32
New Avengers #3, 5-6
New X-Men vol. 2 #1
The Dark Tower: The Gunslinger Born
The Dark Tower: The Long Road Home
The Dark Tower: Treachery
The Official Handbook of the Marvel Universe: Avengers 2004
The Official Handbook of the Marvel Universe: Hulk 2004
The Official Handbook of the Marvel Universe: Spider-Man 2004
The Official Handbook of the Marvel Universe: X-Men 2004
Silver Surfer/Witchblade #½, 1
Spider-Man: Get Kraven #1-2, 4-6
Supreme Power #1-15, 18
Supreme Power Special Edition #1
Thor vol. 2 #29, 32-35
Ultimate Iron Man #1-5
Ultimate Spider-Man #58-133
Ultimate Spider-Man Annual #1
Ultimate X-Men #3, 5, 7-8, 11-14, 16-21, 23-25, 27, 29-34, 36-43, 58-62, 65, 67
Uncanny X-Men #383, 386, 388, 460-461
Warlock vol. 4 #1Weapon Zero/Silver Surfer #1Wolverine vol. 3 #24-28, 30-31, 33, 36Wolverine: The End #1Wolverine: Origin #1-6Wolverine: Origins #1-5Wolverine: Weapon X #1X-51: Machine Man #1X-Men'' vol. 2 #83

Frequent collaborators
Joe Quesada
Jae Lee
Adam Kubert
Andy Kubert
Brandon Peterson

Notes

References

External links
NYC'07 Stephen King's "Gunslinger Born" Panel Coverage at Newsarama
Comic Book Award Almanach
Richard Isanove at the Cal'Arts Alumni Catalogue

Interviews
Richard Isanove on The Dark Tower at Newsarama
Interview with Joe Quesada about the series at Newsarama
Interview with Richard isanove about the series at Lilja's Library
Drawing Board Interview Richard Isanove
Man Without Fear Interview Richard Isanove

1968 births
Comics colorists
French comics artists
Living people
École nationale supérieure des arts décoratifs alumni